Zhongwei (Xiao'erjing: جْووِ شِ) is a prefecture-level city of Ningxia, People's Republic of China. The city is known for its wolfberry and Gobi watermelon cultivation. One of the world's largest photovoltaic power station, Tengger Desert Solar Park, is located in Zhongwei.

History 
Under general Meng Tian, the Qin captured the area of Zhongwei and established the Beidi Commandery.  In 205 BC a city was built at the current location of Zhongwei urban area, which would grow as irrigation systems were built to allow farming.

In 1226 Genghis Khan captured Zhongwei. In 1403 the city was named Zhongwei, part of Shaanxi.

In 1920 Zhongwei was struck by the Haiyuan earthquake. In 1926 the highway from Lanzhou to Zhongwei opened.

Tourism
Zhongwei's main attraction is Gao Miao, a temple that has hosted Confucian, Buddhist, and Taoist ceremonies. A bomb shelter was also built beneath the temple during the Cultural Revolution. It has since been converted into a rendition of a Buddhist hell. The prefecture is also the location of the beginning of the northern bend in the Yellow River that produces the Ordos Loop. A drum tower is located in the city center.

Administrative divisions

Geography
Zhongwei is located on the northern banks of the Yellow River and bordered directly by the Tengger Desert in the north. The city has been battling desertification since the 1950s. Using straw checkerboard patterns the advance of sand dunes is stopped.

Climate

Transportation

 Zhongwei Shapotou Airport
 Baotou–Lanzhou railway
 Baoji–Zhongwei railway, to points south (connections to Xi'an, Chengdu)
 Taiyuan-Zhongwei-Yinchuan railway, to the east (connection to Beijing)
 Gantang–Wuwei railway, to western Gansu and westward
 Zhongwei–Lanzhou high-speed railway
 G70 Fuzhou–Yinchuan Expressway
 G2012 Dingbian–Wuwei Expressway
 China National Highway 109

Gallery

See also
Zhongwei-Tongxin fault

References

External links
Official website of Zhongwei Government

 
Prefecture-level divisions of Ningxia
Cities in Ningxia